Mary Poppins Returns: Original Motion Picture Soundtrack is the soundtrack album for the film of the same name. The songs and score for the film were composed by Marc Shaiman, with song lyrics written by Scott Wittman and Shaiman. The soundtrack album was released by Walt Disney Records on December 7, 2018.

The songs feature vocal performances by the film's cast consisting of Emily Blunt, Lin-Manuel Miranda, Ben Whishaw, Emily Mortimer, Pixie Davies, Julie Walters, Dick Van Dyke, Angela Lansbury, and Meryl Streep.

Background
Composer-songwriter Marc Shaiman and co-lyricist Scott Wittman began working on the score and songs in 2016. They wrote nine original songs for the film.  In 2018, the song The Place Where Lost Things Go was nominated for an Oscar for Best Original Song and the film score was also nominated for Best Original Score.

The score includes musical references to the songs and score from the first film written by the Sherman Brothers: these songs include "A Spoonful of Sugar", "The Perfect Nanny", "Feed The Birds" and "Let's Go Fly a Kite". Richard M. Sherman served as music consultant, with Shaiman stating that "if he had something that he thought should have been different or changed, he would have said so. But lo and behold, he didn’t. He was loving what he was hearing, and he really loves the new movie".

On November 26, 2018, "The Place Where Lost Things Go" (sung by Emily Blunt) and "Trip a Little Light Fantastic" (sung by Lin-Manuel Miranda and the cast) were released, and the soundtrack was made available for digital pre-order.

As indicated in the liner notes, the track "Theme from Mary Poppins Returns" was not used in the final film; it was, however, featured in trailers for the movie. One song deleted from the film before a cast recording was made, "The Anthropomorphic Zoo" - a song originally intended for the "Royal Doulton Bowl" sequence - is excluded from the soundtrack album, but a demo recording, illustrated with storyboard images, is included as a bonus feature on the home media release of the film.

Track listing

Charts

Weekly charts

Year-end charts

References

2018 soundtrack albums
Walt Disney Records soundtracks
Mary Poppins
Disney film soundtracks
Musical film soundtracks
Fantasy film soundtracks